The 1963–64 Divizia A was the forty-sixth season of Divizia A, the top-level football league of Romania.

Teams

League table

Results

Top goalscorers

Champion squad

See also 

 1963–64 Divizia B
 1963–64 Divizia C

References

Liga I seasons
Romania
1963–64 in Romanian football